Sainte-Menehould is a commune in the Marne department in north-eastern France. The 18th-century French playwright Charles-Georges Fenouillot de Falbaire de Quingey (1727–1800) died in Sainte-Ménéhould. It was the subprefecture of the arrondissement of Sainte-Menehould until its abolition in April 2017.

History
Dom Pérignon, the Benedictine monk who made important contributions to the production and quality of Champagne wine, and is often (erroneously) credited with its invention, was born in Sainte-Menehould around 1638.

As part of the county of Clermont-en-Argonne, Sainte-Menehould was in the Duchy of Lorraine until 1641, when the county was ceded to France; in 1648, it was granted as an appanage to Louis, le Grand Condé, effectively making it independent of Crown control.

Condé established Sainte-Menehould as his capital and fortified it in 1652, when he was leader of the 1650-1653 civil war known as the Fronde des nobles. The military engineer Vauban worked on the fortifications as a member of Condé's regiment; he changed sides when captured by a Royalist patrol in early 1653. Condé's governor, the Comte de Montal surrendered the town in November 1653, allegedly in return for a payment of 50,000 pistoles.

After his return to France in 1659, Condé retained Clermont, which remained in his family until the abolition of feudalism in France during the French Revolution in 1790. The next year, Louis XVI passed through the town during the Flight to Varennes, where he was recognized, allegedly on account of the similarity between his face and the image on the coinage. The royal party left the town before the significance of the king's recognition had been acted upon, but they were pursued along the road towards Varennes and arrested by Citizen Drouet the local postmaster.

130 years later Ste-Menehould was important in the Champagne Riots of 1910/1911.

Following the end of World War I, Sainte-Menehould saw the birth of French sociologist Michel Crozier.

Population

Cuisine

The town and its several restaurants pride themselves on serving a local specialty called pied de cochon or pig's trotter à la Sainte-Menehould, which are cooked for hours, to the point of softening the bones and making them edible.

Twinning

 Cupar, Fife, Scotland

Cap-Pelé, NB, Canada

See also
Communes of the Marne department
French wine

References

External links

Official website

Communes of Marne (department)
Champagne (province)
Marne communes articles needing translation from French Wikipedia